"Fresh Wind" is a song performed by Australian praise and worship group Hillsong Worship. It was released as a single from their upcoming album on 22 January 2021. The song was written by Ben Fielding, Brooke Ligertwood, David Ware, and Matt Crocker. Michael Guy Chislett and Brooke Ligertwood handled the production of the single.

"Fresh Wind" peaked at No. 23 on the US Hot Christian Songs chart.

Background
On 22 January 2021, Hillsong Worship released "Fresh Wind" as a single. The song features Brooke Ligertwood and David Ware as lead vocalists. Brooke Ligertwood shared the story behind the song in an interview with NewReleaseToday, saying:

Composition

Commercial performance
"Fresh Wind" debuted at number 23 on the US Hot Christian Songs chart dated 6 February 2021, concurrently debuting at number 12 on the Christian Digital Song Sales chart that same week.

Music videos
Hillsong Worship released the audio video of "Fresh Wind", showcasing the single's artwork on YouTube on 22 January 2021. On 2 February 2021, the lyric video of the song was published by Hillsong Worship on their YouTube channel.

Personnel
Credits adapted from AllMusic.

 Michael Guy Chislett — producer
 Sam Gibson — mixing
 Bruno Gruel — mastering engineer
 Hillsong Worship — primary artist
 Brooke Ligertwood — producer

Charts

Release history

References

External links
 

2020 songs
2021 singles
Hillsong Worship songs
Songs written by Brooke Fraser